Alice Hirson (born March 10, 1929) is an American actress best known for her roles on television. She began her career on stage, before roles on daytime soap operas. She is best known for her roles as Mavis Anderson in the CBS prime time soap opera Dallas and as Lois Morgan, the mother of the title character on the ABC sitcom Ellen.

Early life
Hirson was born Alice Thorsell in New York City on March 10, 1929.

Career 
She began her career on off-Broadway stage, before roles in 1960s plays Traveller Without Luggage and The Investigation.

Television
Hirson began her television career appearing on the classic anthology series Hallmark Hall of Fame and Starlight Theatre. From 1969 to 1970, she was a regular cast member on the CBS daytime soap opera The Edge of Night, playing the role of Stephanie Martin. She played the role of Marcia Davis on Another World and its spin-off Somerset from 1970 to 1972. From 1972 to 1976, Hirson starred as Eileen Riley Siegel on ABC's One Life to Live. She also had a recurring role on General Hospital in 1982.

After leaving daytime television, Hirson began playing supporting roles on prime time. In 1977, she appeared in made-for-television movies The Death of Richie, Alexander: The Other Side of Dawn, and Having Babies II, and the following year co-starred opposite Cicely Tyson in A Woman Called Moses. Hirson also guest-starred on Maude, The Waltons, Family, Barnaby Jones, Flamingo Road, Barney Miller, Quincy, M.E., St. Elsewhere, Hotel, and Full House. From 1982 to 1988, Hirson played the recurring role of Mavis Anderson, friend and confidante of Miss Ellie Ewing (Barbara Bel Geddes) in the CBS prime time soap opera, Dallas.

In 1992, Hirson was a regular cast member on the short-lived NBC sitcom Home Fires starring Kate Burton. From 1994 to 1998, she played the role of Lois Morgan, the mother of Ellen DeGeneres' character on the ABC comedy series, Ellen. From 1996 to 2006, she appeared in eight episodes of The WB family drama series, 7th Heaven playing Jenny Jackson, mother of Annie Camden (Catherine Hicks), whose illness and death occurred as the series began in 1996. She also had recurring roles on Murphy Brown and The Secret Life of the American Teenager, and guest-starred on Law & Order, ER, NYPD Blue, Judging Amy, Just Shoot Me!, and Cold Case.

Film
Hirson made her film debut in the 1971 crime comedy The Gang That Couldn't Shoot Straight. In 1979, she appeared in the horror film Nightwing and played the First Lady of the United States in the comedy-drama Being There. She also appeared in Private Benjamin, Revenge of the Nerds, Mass Appeal, Blind Date, Bride of Boogedy, The Big Picture, The Glass House, and The Lost.

Personal life 
In 1964, Hirson met actor Stephen Elliott. They were married from 1980 until Elliott's death in 2005. She was previously married to dramatist Roger O. Hirson.

Filmography

Film

Television

References

External links

1929 births
Living people
20th-century American actresses
21st-century American actresses
American soap opera actresses
American television actresses